The George E. Pake Prize is a prize that has been awarded annually by the American Physical Society since 1984. The recipients are chosen for "outstanding work by physicists combining original research accomplishments with leadership in the management of research or development in industry". The prize is named after George E. Pake (1924–2004), founding director of Xerox PARC, and as of 2007 it is valued at $5,000.

Recipients 
Source: American Physical Society

See also
 List of physics awards

External links 
 George E. Pake Prize, American Physical Society

Awards of the American Physical Society